Santino Garsi da Parma (22 February 1542 – 17 January 1604) was an Italian lutenist and composer of the late Renaissance.

His music was used as a basis for part of the Ancient Airs and Dances Suite No. 3 by Ottorino Respighi.

Italian musicians
1542 births
1604 deaths